Nash is a civil parish in Shropshire, England.  It contains seven listed buildings that are recorded in the National Heritage List for England.  Of these, two are at Grade II*, the middle of the three grades, and the others are at Grade II, the lowest grade. The parish contains the village of Nash and the surrounding countryside.  The listed buildings consist of a 14th-century church, a former manor house and associated structures, a country house, a farmhouse, and a row of houses, originally almshouses.  
 

Key

Buildings

References

Citations

Sources

Lists of buildings and structures in Shropshire